Lié Louis Périn-Salbreux (October 12, 1753 – December 20, 1817) was a French artist.

He was born in Reims, France, where his father was a textile manufacturer. Périn-Salbreux was a painter, pastellist, and a miniaturist.

References 

1753 births
1817 deaths
Artists from Reims
18th-century French painters
French male painters
19th-century French painters
19th-century French male artists
18th-century French male artists
Pastel artists